Fremskritt (literally "Progress") is a Norwegian newspaper. It is the official party organ of the Progress Party.

History and profile
Fremskritt was established in 1974. The paper is distributed 22 times per year to all members of the Progress Party. It is also available as a free internet newspaper.

References

External links
Official site

1974 establishments in Norway
Publications established in 1974
Progress Party (Norway)
Newspapers published in Oslo